Haptics may refer to:

 Haptics, any form of interaction involving touch
 Haptic communication, the means by which people and other animals communicate via touching
 Haptic perception, the process of recognizing objects through touch
 Haptic poetry, a liminal art form combining characteristics of typography and sculpture
 Haptic technology, technology that interfaces with the user through the sense of touch

See also
 Somatosensory system, the biology of sensory receptors
 Tactile signing, method of deafblind communication
 Tactile (disambiguation)